Laert Papa (born 22 January 2003) is an Albanian professional footballer who plays as a midfielder for Greek Super League 2 club AEK Athens B.

References

2003 births
Living people
Albanian footballers
Albania youth international footballers
Super League Greece 2 players
AEK Athens F.C. players
Albanian expatriate footballers
Expatriate footballers in Greece
Association football midfielders
AEK Athens F.C. B players